The Vombatiformes are one of the three suborders of the large marsupial order Diprotodontia. Seven of the nine known families within this suborder are extinct; only the families Phascolarctidae, with the koala, and Vombatidae, with three extant species of wombat, survive.

Among the extinct families are the Diprotodontidae, which includes the rhinoceros sized Diprotodon, believed to be the largest marsupials ever, as well as the "marsupial lions" Thylacoleonidae and "marsupial tapirs" Palorchestidae. "Vombatiformes" is neo-Latin for "wombat-shaped things", and took its name from its type family.

The suborder Vombatiformes, with its closely related members and their compact body form, contrasts with the other two diprotodont suborders, the Macropodiformes: kangaroos, wallabies, and the quokka; and the Phalangeriformes: possums, including the gliders such as the wrist-winged gliders. The koala and wombats are believed by many biologists to share a common ancestor and to have diverged only recently in the Cenozoic.

In June 2020, Mukupirna nambensis, within its own family Mukupirnidae, was declared by scientists after studying fossils originally discovered in Lake Eyre in 1973, and rediscovered in a drawer in the American Natural History Museum in New York around 2010. The study revealed that the fossil represented the closest fossil relative of the wombat family, meaning that they all evolved from a common ancestor. Mukupirna means "big bones" in the Diyari and Malyangapa languages of the area where it was found.

Classification

Suborder Vombatiformes

 Family Vombatidae: wombats (three modern species)
 Genus †Rhizophascolonus
 Genus Vombatus
 Genus †Phascolonus
 Genus †Warendja
 Genus †Ramsayia
 Genus Lasiorhinus
 Family Phascolarctidae: koala (one modern species)
 Genus †Perikoala
 Genus †Madakoala
 Genus †Koobor
 Genus †Litokoala
 Genus †Nimiokoala
 Genus Phascolarctos
 Family †Ilariidae
 genus †Nimbadon
 Genus †Koalemas
 Genus †Kuterintja
 Genus †Ilaria
 Family †Maradidae
 Genus †Marada 
 Family †Mukupirnidae
 Genus †Mukupirna nambensis
 Family †Thylacoleonidae: (marsupial lions)
 Genus †Thylacoleo
 Genus †Priscileo
 Genus †Wakaleo
 Genus †Microleo
 Family †Wynyardiidae
 Genus †Wynyardia
 Genus †Muramura
 Genus †Namilamadeta
 Superfamily Diprotodontoidea
 Family †Diprotodontidae: (giant wombats)
 Genus †Alkwertatherium
 Genus †Bematherium
 Genus †Pyramios
 Genus †Nototherium
 Genus †Meniscolophus
 Genus †Euryzygoma
 Genus †Diprotodon
 Genus †Euowenia
 Genus †Sthenomerus
 Subfamily †Zygomaturinae
 Genus †Silvabestius
 Genus †Neohelos
 Genus †Raemeotherium
 Genus †Plaisiodon
 Genus †Zygomaturus
 Genus †Kolopsis
 Genus †Kolopsoides
 Genus †Hulitherium
 Genus †Maokopia
 Family †Palorchestidae: (marsupial tapirs)
 Genus †Palorchestes
 Genus †Propalorchestes
 Genus †Ngapakaldia
 Genus †Pitikantia

References

 

 
Chattian first appearances